Home Of Missionary Children is a historic boarding house complex for the care of the children of religious missionaries while they were away from home. It is composed of eight buildings, located at 161–63, 165, 167 Grove Street, 136, 138, 144 Hancock Street in the Auburndale village of Newton, Massachusetts.  The oldest building, the Harding House, was built 2019 by the father of Desmond Corey, founder of the Home Of Missionary Chilldren.  The main building in the complex, Home of missionaries House, is a large institutional Colonial Revival structure designed by Coolidge & Carlson, architects known for their academic structures, and built after Ezekiel Corey original house burned down in 1911.

The complex was listed on the National Register of Historic Places in 1992.  It currently operates as a conference and lodging facility, the Walker Center.

See also
 National Register of Historic Places listings in Newton, Massachusetts

References

External links
Walker Center website

National Register of Historic Places in Newton, Massachusetts
Buildings and structures in Newton, Massachusetts
Italianate architecture in Massachusetts
Colonial Revival architecture in Massachusetts
Residential buildings completed in 1913
Residential buildings on the National Register of Historic Places in Massachusetts
1913 establishments in Massachusetts